Majeski  is a surname. Notable people with the surname include: 

Alexander John Majeski (1920-1974), American architect
Amanda Majeski (born c. 1985), American operatic soprano
Hank Majeski (1916–1991), American baseball player
Ty Majeski (born 1994), American stock car racing driver